Ranunculales is an order of flowering plants. Of necessity it contains the family Ranunculaceae, the buttercup family, because the name of the order is based on the name of a genus in that family. Ranunculales belongs to a paraphyletic group known as the basal eudicots. It is the most basal clade in this group; in other words, it is sister to the remaining eudicots. Widely known members include poppies, barberries, hellebores, and buttercups.

Taxonomy
The Angiosperm Phylogeny Group recognized seven families in Ranunculales in their APG III system, published in 2009. In the preceding APG II system, they offered the option of three segregate families as shown below.

 order Ranunculales
 family Berberidaceae
 family Circaeasteraceae
 [+ family Kingdoniaceae ]
 family Eupteleaceae
 family Lardizabalaceae
 family Menispermaceae
 family Papaveraceae
 [+ family Fumariaceae ]
 [+ family Pteridophyllaceae ]
 family Ranunculaceae
Note: "+ ..." = optionally separate family (that may be split off from the preceding family).

Under this definition, well-known members of Ranunculales include buttercups, clematis, columbines, delphiniums, and poppies.

A phylogeny of Ranunculales was published in 2009, based on molecular phylogenetic analysis of DNA sequences. The authors of this paper revised the subfamilies and tribes of the order. This is reflected in the subsequent revision of the APG, APG IV (2016).

The analysis revealed that the order consisted of three clades, Eupteleaceae, Papaveraceae and a third clade, considered to be the "core" Ranuculales, consisting of the remaining five families. The phylogeny of the families is shown in the cladogram.

Evolution

The fossil form Leefructus, described in 2011, has been recognized as a member of this order. Leefructus mirus shows fully developed leaves; stem and flower that are very similar in structure to those of the modern buttercups.  The fossil is dated to 125 million years old and it not only proves that Ranunculales is an ancient group of eudicots but demonstrates that the whole angiosperm clade may be older than expected. The structure of the plant and its age may lead to a new approach regarding the field that studies the evolution of flowering plants. 
The fact that Leefructus shows a well-developed structure similar to modern ranunculids suggests that this group of eudicots may have developed earlier than the age of the fossil.

History
Historically the term Ranales was used to include the Ranunculaceae and related families, as described by Bentham and Hooker. This became replaced with Ranunculales by Melchior in 1964.

The Cronquist system (1981) also recognised the order, but placed it in the subclass Magnoliidae, in class Magnoliopsida [= dicotyledons]. It used this circumscription:
 order Ranunculales
 family Ranunculaceae
 family Circaeasteraceae
 family Berberidaceae
 family Sargentodoxaceae
 family Lardizabalaceae
 family Menispermaceae
 family Coriariaceae
 family Sabiaceae

In the Cronquist system, the Papaveraceae and Fumariaceae (including the plants in the optional family Pteridophyllaceae) were treated as a separate order Papaverales, placed in this same subclass Magnoliidae. The Cronquist circumscription of Ranunculales is now known to be polyphyletic. Sabiaceae is in a clade of basal eudicots separate from Ranunculales. Coriariaceae is now placed in the order Cucurbitales.

References

Bibliography

External links
 NCBI Taxonomy Browser

 
Angiosperm orders
Extant Aptian first appearances